No. 311 (Czechoslovak) Squadron RAF was a Czechoslovak-manned bomber squadron of the Royal Air Force in the Second World War. It was the RAF's only Czechoslovak-manned medium and heavy bomber squadron. It suffered the heaviest losses of any Czechoslovak formation in the RAF. In the Second World War 511 Czechoslovaks serving in Allied air forces were killed. Of these 273 (53%) died while serving with 311 Squadron.

After the end of the war, 311 Squadron was disbanded as an RAF unit and became the 6 letecká divize ("6th Air Division") of the reformed Czechoslovak Air Force.

History

Bomber Command

The squadron was formed at RAF Honington in Suffolk on 29 July 1940, although RAF records give the official date as 2 August. It was crewed mostly by Czechoslovaks who had escaped from German-occupied Europe. Some were airmen who had trained with the Czechoslovak Air Force, escaped to France, served in the French Air Force in the Battle of France and then been evacuated to the UK. Others were soldiers who had served in Czechoslovak Army units in the Battle of France, been evacuated to the UK and then volunteered to transfer to the RAF Volunteer Reserve in order to serve in 311 Squadron.

The squadron was equipped initially with Wellington Mark I medium bombers, which were soon succeeded by Wellingtons of Marks IA and IC.

From 16 September 1940 the squadron was based at RAF East Wretham in Norfolk as part of Bomber Command's No. 3 Group, whose commanding officer was Air Vice-Marshal John Baldwin. He said 311 Squadron "put up a wonderful show" and had "the finest navigators in Bomber Command".

On 18 January 1941 HM King George VI and his consort Queen Elizabeth visited the squadron at East Wretham.

On 6 February 1941 six of the squadron's Wellington Mk IC aircraft took part in a raid on Boulogne-sur-Mer in German-occupied France. On the return flight one aircraft, L7842/T, suffered navigation problems. Then it ran low on fuel, its commander Plt Off František Cigoš mistakenly judged that they were over England and he landed at Flers in northern France. Both the aircraft and its crew were captured. The Luftwaffe repainted KX-T in German markings and transferred it to its Erprobungsstelle (experimental and test facility) at Rechlin–Lärz Airfield in Mecklenburg.

On 20 June 1941 the squadron gave a dinner for the President of the Czechoslovak government-in-exile, Edvard Beneš. Other guests included Foreign Minister Jan Masaryk and Defence Minister, General Antonín Hasal-Nižborský.

 
311 Squadron was with Bomber Command for 19 months. In that time it flew 1,029 sorties, attacked 77 targets, dropped  of explosive bombs and 95,438 incendiary bombs. It attacked targets in Germany, Italy, and occupied Belgium, France and the Netherlands. Its most frequent targets were Cologne, Hamburg and Kiel in Germany and Dunkirk, Brest and Boulogne in France.

The squadron deployed 318 airmen formed into 53 aircrew. 94 were killed on operations and 34 were captured: a loss rate of more than 40%. Unlike crews derived from England or the Commonwealth nations, there were no Czechoslovakian replacement crews arriving to fill the ranks of the lost. To keep the squadron functional, it would have to be put to a different use.

Coastal Command
At the end of April 1942 the squadron was transferred from Bomber Command to Coastal Command in to undertake maritime patrols. It moved to RAF Aldergrove in Northern Ireland on 28 April and began maritime patrol training on 1 May. The squadron was made part of No. 19 Group RAF, moved to RAF Talbenny in Wales on 12 June and undertook its first anti-submarine patrol on 30 June. Its Wellingtons lacked air to surface vessel (ASV) radar, but despite this between June 1942 and April 1943 the squadron achieved the highest success rate of any Coastal Command squadron.

Throughout July and August the squadron's Wellingtons remained in Bomber Command's Temperate Land Scheme camouflage: dark green and dark earth above, and black below. This was unsuitable for maritime patrols, but not until September 1942 were the aircraft repainted in Coastal Command's Temperate Sea Scheme: dark slate grey and extra dark sea grey above, and white below.

In April 1943 the squadron was partly re-equipped with five Wellington Mark X aircraft. Air Vice-Marshal Karel Janoušek, Inspector-General of the Czechoslovak Air Force, eventually convinced the UK Air Ministry to re-equip the squadron with Consolidated Liberator heavy bombers, as these had radar and a longer range, both of which made them more suitable for maritime patrols. Retraining flights began on 25 May and continued until August.

On 26 May 1943 the squadron moved to RAF Beaulieu in Hampshire. On 4 August it celebrated its third anniversary. Guests again included President Beneš and Foreign Minister Masaryk. They included also General Sergej Ingr, who had succeeded General Hasal-Nižborský as Defence Minister, and the head of Coastal Command, Air Marshal John Slessor.

On 21 August 1943 the squadron began maritime patrols with Consolidated Liberator GR Mk V aircraft and continued anti-submarine work, but now over the Bay of Biscay. On 10 November Liberator BZ774/D, led by Flt Sgt Otto Žanta, attacked  with rocket projectiles (RP's) off the Galician coast. The submarine ran aground and her crew abandoned her.

On 27 December 1943 Liberator BZ796/H, led by Plt Off Oldřich Doležal, attacked the German blockade runner  in the Bay of Biscay. Doležal's crew set the cargo ship on fire with five RP's and a  bomb, and she sank the next day.

In February 1944 the squadron was re-equipped with nine Liberator C Mk VI aircraft. On 23 February it moved to RAF Predannack in Cornwall.

On 7 August 1944 the squadron transferred to RAF Tain in Scotland and its area of operations changed from the Bay of Biscay and Western Approaches to the North Sea. In September its rôle was changed from day to night anti-submarine patrols. On 27 October Fleet Air Arm aircraft from  damaged , forcing her to run aground on the coast of German-occupied Norway. Two days later two 311 Squadron Liberators, FL949/Y led by Fg Off Josef Pavelka and BZ723/H led by Sqn Ldr Alois Šedivý, damaged the grounded submarine with salvos of RP's. Later two Halifax heavy bombers of No. 502 Squadron RAF finished off U-1060 with depth charges.

In February 1945 the squadron was re-equipped, again with Liberator C Mk VI aircraft but now equipped with anti-submarine Leigh Lights. In March the entire squadron took part in the "Chilli-II" and "Chilli-III" raids on German submarine training areas in the Baltic.

311 Squadron was with Coastal Command for 38 months, in which time it flew 2,111 sorties. By the end of the war 247 of its men had been killed, either in combat or in accidents. 33 of its members were released from German prisoner-of-war camps. One PoW, Plt Off Arnošt Valenta, was murdered by the Gestapo in March 1944 for taking part in the Great Escape from Stalag Luft III.

Peacetime transport
After the End of World War II in Europe, on 26 May 1945 the Czechoslovak government-in-exile formed the Letecká dopravní skupina ("Air Transport Group"), and recruited most of its personnel from 311 Squadron. Its initial aircraft were two Avro Anson C XII aircraft bought from the RAF. On 12 June 1945 the unit began flights to Ruzyně Airport, Prague. By October the Letecká dopravní skupina had also acquired a number of Siebel Si 204D aircraft seized from Germany as war reparations.

On 25 June 1945 the remainder of 311 Squadron was transferred to RAF Transport Command's No. 301 Wing. It too flew transport flights to Ruzyně Airport, the first being on 30 July from RAF Manston in Kent, where the squadron was based from 3 August. On 21 August the squadron relocated to Ruzynĕ. The squadron first transferred military equipment and personnel from the UK to Czechoslovakia. It then repatriated Czechoslovak civilians.

Czechoslovak runways were found to be unsuitable for Liberators. Therefore, in December 1945 all those of 311 squadron were returned to the UK, landing at RAF Valley in Wales.

311 Squadron was officially disbanded as an RAF unit at RAF Milltown in Moray, Scotland on 15 February 1946. Most of its personnel had transferred to the Czechoslovak Air Force in August 1945, and in Czechoslovakia the unit was officially disbanded on 15 January 1946, but its personnel were not officially discharged from the RAF until 30 June 1946.

On 15 January 1946 311 Squadron became the Czechoslovak 6 letecká divize ("6th Air Division") at Havlíčkův Brod in southeastern Bohemia. In May it was divided into Letecký pluk 24 and Letecký pluk 25 ("24th and 25th Air Regiments"). Letecký pluk 24 was given the name Biskajsky ("Biscay") and initially equipped with Mosquito FB Mk VI fighter-bombers. Letecký pluk 25 was given the name Atlanticky ("Atlantic") and equipped with Petlyakov Pe-2FT aircraft.

Squadron codes
This squadron displayed the squadron code letters "KX" and later "PP" on its Wellingtons and "PP" on its Liberators.

Commanding officers

Squadron bases

Aircraft operated

Notable incidents

1942 Wellington crash

On 18 October 1942 Wellington 1C aircraft of 311 Squadron crashed and burst into flames at South Ruislip, Middlesex, on approach to RAF Northolt. The aircraft was en route to a debriefing and was carrying nine passengers as well as its usual crew of six. Everyone aboard was killed, along with four children and two mothers on the ground.

1945 Liberator crash

On 8 October 1945 a Liberator B-24 GR.VI aircraft of 311 Squadron suffered an engine fire, crashed and burst into flames in a field at Elvetham, near Hartley Wintney, Hampshire. Five minutes earlier it had taken off from RAF Blackbushe on a flight to Ruzyně Airport, Prague. All 23 people aboard were killed: five crew, 17 passengers and one stowaway. The passengers included nine women and five young children, the latter ranging from 18 months to three years old.

Legacy
In 1964, 311 Squadron veteran Richard Husmann, writing as Filip Jánský, published his novel Nebeští jezdci, portraying the lives of Czech and Polish airmen in the wartime RAF. In 1968 a film based on the book was released, having been made the previous year around Klecany military airfield north of Prague. In 1969 Hodder & Stoughton published an English translation of the book as Riders in the Sky.

In 1999 the Air Café commemorating No. 311 Squadron RAF opened in Brno, South Moravia. It is in the early 17th-century Dietrichstein Palace, which also houses the Moravian Museum. The café exhibits a small collection of memorabilia connected with the Czechoslovak-manned squadron.

In February 2016 the 438th Air Expeditionary Advisory Squadron, 438th Air Expeditionary Advisory Group, USAF, Kabul, Afghanistan, was renamed 311th Air Expeditionary Advisory Squadron, to follow in the traditions of the squadron, under Czech Air Force command. This 311 Squadron was disbanded in February 2019.

See also
1942 Ruislip Wellington accident
Elvetham air crash
Charles Pickard
Jindřich Svoboda
Arnošt Valenta
Tomáš Lom
List of Royal Air Force aircraft squadrons

References

Notes

Bibliography

External links

 – movement and equipment history with Bomber Command
 – movement and equipment history with Coastal Command
 Air Cafe in Brno, a cafe to commemorate the Czech manned squadron with a small exhibition of memorabilia

311
Military units and formations established in 1940
Military units and formations disestablished in 1946
311 Squadron